The Karaağaç station or before 1971 Edirne station was the name of the former railway station in Edirne, located  south-west of the city. Currently, it houses Trakya University's Faculty of Fine Arts.

History
In 1868, the Compagnie des Chemins de Fer Orientaux (CO), Orient Railway Company, received a concession to build a railway to Vienna, Austria via Edirne. In 1871, the line reached Edirne but in order to avoid building a bridge across the Maritsa River, the station was built in Karaağaç in 1873. Edirne was a former capital in the Ottoman Empire, noted for grand architecture, and in 1914 the larger station was built that stands today, designed by Ahmet Kemaleddin in the Turkish Neoclassical style, similar to Sirkeci railway station in Istanbul. After the Turkish Independence War, and the signing of the Treaty of Lausanne, the Turkish-Greek border was on the Maritsa River except the Karaağaç section that remained in Turkish territory.

The line was used by the Greek State Railways (OSE) until 1971 when the Turkish State Railways (TCDD) built a line from Pehlivanköy through the city of Edirne to the Bulgarian border, and OSE built a short cut-off between Marasia and Nea Vyssa to avoid Turkish territory near Edirne. This resulted in the abandonment of the station in 1971.

Today
Following redevelopment works, the railway station building was converted into Faculty of Fine Arts of Trakya University in Edirne. Opened in 1998, the Treaty of Lausanne Monument and Museum are located next to the former railway station.

References

External links

Defunct railway stations in Turkey
Railway stations opened in 1873
Railway stations closed in 1971
Railway stations in Edirne Province
First Turkish National architecture
Redevelopment projects in Turkey
Ottoman architecture in Edirne
Trakya University
1873 establishments in the Ottoman Empire
Tourist attractions in Edirne
1971 disestablishments in Turkey